Olivia Ortiz (born 23 October 1997) is an American rugby union player. She is a scrumhalf for the Colorado Gray Wolves in the WPL and the US Eagles internationally.

Ortiz made her international debut for the United States against England on June 2019.

In 2022, Ortiz was named in the starting line-up in the warm-up match against Scotland, which the Eagles won in a closely contested match. She also started in the game against England in Exeter, the Red Roses heavily defeated the Eagles 52–14 ahead of the World Cup.

Ortiz was selected in the Eagles squad for the delayed 2021 Rugby World Cup in New Zealand.

References

External links 

 Eagles Profile

Living people
1997 births
Female rugby union players
American female rugby union players
United States women's international rugby union players